Frederik Lamp (6 September 1905 – 27 May 1945) was a Dutch sprinter. He competed in the men's 100 metres event at the 1924 Summer Olympics. He died during World War II.

References

External links
 

1905 births
1945 deaths
Dutch male sprinters
Dutch military personnel killed in World War II
Athletes (track and field) at the 1924 Summer Olympics
Olympic athletes of the Netherlands
Sportspeople from Haarlem
Dutch people who died in prison custody
Prisoners who died in Japanese detention
Dutch prisoners of war in World War II
World War II prisoners of war held by Japan
Royal Netherlands East Indies Army personnel of World War II
20th-century Dutch people